Edy Germán Brambila Rosales (born 15 January 1986) is a Mexican professional footballer who plays as a midfielder.

Honours
Pachuca
Mexican Championship: Clausura 2006
CONCACAF Champions' Cup: 2007, 2008
CONCACAF Champions League: 2009–10

Tapachula
Ascenso MX: Clausura 2018

Notes

References

External links
 
 

1986 births
Living people
Sportspeople from Tepic, Nayarit
Footballers from Nayarit
Association football midfielders
Mexican footballers
Mexican people of Italian descent
C.F. Pachuca players
Club León footballers
Deportivo Toluca F.C. players
Atlas F.C. footballers
Cafetaleros de Chiapas footballers
Liga MX players